The 2009 Men's World Open Squash Championship is the men's edition of the World Open, which serves as the individual world championship for squash players. The event took place in the Kuwait City in Kuwait from 1 to 7 November 2009.  Amr Shabana won his fourth World Open title, defeating Ramy Ashour in the final.

Ranking points
In 2009, the points breakdown were as follows:

Seeds

Draws & Results

Finals

Top Half

Section 1

Section 2

Bottom Half

Section 1

Section 2

See also
World Open
2009 Women's World Open Squash Championship
2009 Men's World Team Squash Championships

External links
 World Open 2009 at Squashsite

World Squash Championships
M
M
M
Squash tournaments in Kuwait
Sport in Kuwait City
21st century in Kuwait City
International sports competitions hosted by Kuwait